Margaret A. (Peggy) Focarino was, between November 21, 2013, and January 12, 2014, the head of the United States Patent and Trademark Office (USPTO) (by delegation, as Commissioner for Patents). She was appointed in January 2012 after serving as both the Deputy Commissioner for Patents and Deputy Commissioner for Patent Operations.

Biography 

She received a bachelor's degree in physics from the State University of New York at Oswego, and a Certificate in Advanced Public Management from the Maxwell School of Citizenship and Public Affairs at Syracuse University.

Career 

She was the first woman to serve as Commissioner for Patents since the position's creation in 1790, when Thomas Jefferson served as the first Commissioner.

She received in 2010 one of the two annual American University School of Public Affairs Roger W. Jones Award for Executive Leadership.

In 2012, Managing Intellectual Property named Focarino one of the 50 Most Influential People in the World in Intellectual Property, one of only four women to make the list, and the only woman from the Americas.

References

External links
 Margaret A. (Peggy) Focarino, executive biography at the U.S. Patent and Trademark Office, (archived here: https://web.archive.org/web/20150325194908/http://www.uspto.gov/about-us/executive-biographies/margaret-peggy-focarino)

Year of birth missing (living people)
Living people
21st-century American physicists
United States Commissioners of Patents
State University of New York at Oswego alumni